Tricholita is a genus of moths in the family Noctuidae.

Species
 Tricholita baranca Barnes, 1905
 Tricholita bisulca (Grote, 1881)
 Tricholita chipeta Barnes, 1904
 Tricholita elsinora (Barnes, 1904)
 Tricholita ferrisi Crabo & Lafontaine, 2009
 Tricholita fistula Harvey, 1878
 Tricholita knudsoni Crabo & Lafontaine, 2009
 Tricholita notata Strecker, 1898
 Tricholita palmillo (Barnes, 1907) 
 Tricholita signata (Walker, 1860)

References
Natural History Museum Lepidoptera genus database
Tricholita at funet

Hadeninae